The Tisza or Tisa is a river in Central Europe.

Tisza may also refer to:
 István Tisza (1861–1918), Hungarian prime minister, during World War I
 Kálmán Tisza (1830–1902), Hungarian prime minister
 Kata Tisza (born 1980), Hungarian writer
 Lajos Tisza (1832–1898), Hungarian politician
 Laszlo Tisza (1907–2009), Hungarian physicist and philosopher of science
 Tisza Cipő, a Hungarian sports shoe brand
 Tisza culture an archaeological culture from Hungary

See also 
 Tisa (disambiguation)
 Tiso (surname)